Talley is both a given name and surname. Notable people with the name include:

Talley Beatty (1918–1995), American choreographer
André Leon Talley (1948–2022), American journalist
Andy Talley (born 1943), American football coach
Archie Talley (born 1953), American basketball player
Ben Talley (born 1972), American football player
Brent Talley (born 1962), American politician
Carey Talley (born 1976), American soccer player
Darryl Talley (born 1960), American football player
David Talley (born 1950), American  Roman Catholic bishop
Don Talley (1918–1982), American politician
Edward R. Talley (1890–1950), American  soldier
Emma Talley (born 1994), American  golfer
Fred Talley (born 1980), American football player
Gary Talley (born 1947), American singer
James Talley (born 1944), American singer
Jeffrey W. Talley, American soldier
Jeralean Talley (born 1899), American supercentenarian
Jill Talley (born 1962), American actress
Julian Talley (born 1989), American football player
Kevin Talley (born 1979), American heavy metal drummer
Keyth Talley (born 1990), American swimmer
Kirk Talley (born 1958), American singer
Kirk Talley (American football) (born 1959), American football coach
Lynne Talley (born 1954), American oceanographer
Marcia Talley (born 1943), American novelist
Marion Talley (1906–1983), American operatic soprano
Nedra Talley (born 1946), American singer
Nicholas Talley, Australian academic
Ronald Talley (born 1986), American football player
Steve Talley (born 1981), American actor
Thomas W. Talley (1870–1952), American chemist
Wilbur B. Talley, American architect
William Cooper Talley (1831-1903), American politician